Charles Churchill may refer to:

 Charles Churchill (British Army general) (1656–1714), general and brother of John Churchill, 1st Duke of Marlborough
 Charles Churchill (British Army lieutenant-general) (1679–1745), lieutenant-general and son of the above, lover of Anne Oldfield and Member of Parliament
 Charles Churchill (of Chalfont) (1720–1812), colonel and son of the above by Anne Oldfield, Member of Parliament
 Charles Churchill (satirist) (1732–1764), poet and satirist, author of the Rosciad
Charles Churchill (1759–1790), ship's corporal and mutineer on HMS Bounty
 Lord Charles Spencer-Churchill (1794–1840), soldier and Member of Parliament
 Charles Henry Churchill (1828–1877), British officer and diplomat
 Charles Churchill (1837–1916), founder of The Churchill Machine Tool Company